Jeanette P. Dwyer is a former President And current national board member of the National Rural Letter Carriers' Association. When she was elected President in 2011, she became the first female President of a labor union in the history of the United States Postal Service. She served as NRLCA President until 2018, when she chose not to run for reelection. She was reappointed to the national board to fill the remainder of Executive Committeeman Johnny Miller's unexpired term on November 21, 2020. When the 2021 convention was canceled due to COVID-19 (as was the 2021 convention), Dwyer was re-elected to the board at the 116th national convention in Orlando, Florida on September 9, 2022.

Postal career
Jeanette began her postal career in 1981 as a substitute rural letter carrier (designation code 73) in Lake Waccamaw, North Carolina, and became a regular carrier in 1987. She soon got involved in the NRLCA, becoming the local steward, and soon moving on to State Steward of North Carolina.

NRLCA National Board

Dwyer was elected to the NRLCA national board in 2002. She was elected Vice President in 2008. She served on Task Force II, along with three other members, on the Stewards Reference Guide. She also served on the Appeals Committee at National Convention both as a member and chairman of the committee.

Presidency
On August 19, 2011, Jeanette was elected President of the NRLCA at its 107th National Convention in Savannah, Georgia, making the NRLCA the first union of the United States Postal Service ever to elect a female President. The main focus of her tenure as President has been preserving six day mail delivery. In her acceptance speech, she stated:

On February 6, 2013, Postmaster General Patrick R. Donahoe announced that the Postal Service would implement five-day mail delivery beginning August 5, a move he claimed would save $2 billion annually. Later the same day, the national board of the NRLCA voted unanimously to call for his dismissal:

On February 13, Jeanette testifies before the Senate Committee on Homeland Security & Governmental Affairs during a hearing on U.S. Postal Service Oversight. On July 16, the House passed the Financial Services and General Government Appropriations bill, which included language protecting six‐day mail delivery, thereby blocking Donahoe's plan. He retired on November 14, 2014.

Contract with the USPS
When the 2007 contract between the NRLCA & the USPS expired in 2010, negotiations between the two parties ended in an impasse, and went into third party arbitration. Thus, the rural craft was operating without a contract when Jeanette became President. On July 3, 2012, arbitrator Jack Clarke imposed a new contract upon the NRLCA & USPS that ran through 2015.

Concessions by the NRLCA in the new contract mirrored concessions made by the American Postal Workers Union a year earlier. They included a two-year wage freeze, a two-tiered wage structure and increased health care costs (from 19% to 24%). Substitute rural carriers and RCAs hired under the new contract faced a twenty percent cut in pay with no cost-of-living increases. New hire pay was cut from $19.45 to $15.56 per hour. Despite these concessions, Direct of Labor Relations Joey Johnson voted with the USPS arbitrator to accept the contract.

The first agreement negotiated with the USPS under Jeanette's presidency came in 2016. It includes wage increases for rural carriers for each of the three years it runs, as well as cost of living adjustments, and an increase in equipment maintenance allowance. It is also the first rural carrier contract to grant bereavement leave for employees taking time off for the death of a family member.

Personal life
Jeanette & her husband, Larry, were married in 1970. They have one son, Andy, and one grandson, Bobby.

References

Living people
American trade union leaders
Postal officials
Year of birth missing (living people)